The Lie is a 1950 West German crime film directed by Gustav Fröhlich and starring Otto Gebühr, Sybille Schmitz and Cornell Borchers. It was shot at the Bendestorf  Studios. Location shooting took place around Hamburg and Westerland. The film's sets were designed by the art director Franz Schroedter.

Cast
 Otto Gebühr as Professor Dr. Ernst A. Gruber
 Sybille Schmitz as Susanne, seine Tochter
 Cornell Borchers as Ellen, seine Tochter
 Ewald Balser as Dr. Thomas Robertsen, Susannes Mann
 Will Quadflieg as Harry Altenberger
 Hans Leibelt as Martin Altenberger, Bankier, Harrys Vater
 Ilse Bally
 Marianne Wischmann
 Walter Franck
 Rolf Möbius
 Hans Paetsch
 Wolfgang Reimers
 Walter Ladengast
 Walter Gebühr

References

Bibliography

External links 
 

1950 films
1950 crime films
German crime films
West German films
1950s German-language films
Films directed by Gustav Fröhlich
German aviation films
Films set on balloons
German black-and-white films
1950s German films